Alan Henry Morgan Rees (17 February 1938 – 17 March 2022) was a Welsh rugby union and professional rugby league footballer who played in the 1960s. He played representative level rugby union (RU) for Wales, and at club level for Maesteg RFC, as a fly-half. He played club level rugby league (RL) for Leeds. He also played county cricket for Glamorgan from 1955 to 1971.

Background
Alan Rees was born in Neath, Glamorgan, Wales.

International honours
Alan Rees won three caps for Wales (RU) in 1962 against England, Scotland and France.

Cricket career
Rees also played cricket for Glamorgan, making 216 first-class appearances between 1955 and 1968. A fine fielder, he appeared as a substitute in the Third Test Match against Australia at Headingley, taking the catch that dismissed Peter Burge off the bowling of Fred Trueman. This appearance makes him one of the few players to have played on both the rugby and cricket grounds at Headingley. In the match against Middlesex at Lord's in 1965, he became only the second player ever to be given out as "handled the ball" in the County Championship. In 1970 and 1971, he reappeared in Gillette Cup and John Player league matches.

Later life
After his playing career ended, Rees worked as a sports development officer for Afan Borough Council.  He died at Morriston Hospital in 2022, aged 84.

References

External links
 Statistics at espn.com
 
 Statistics at wru.co.uk

1938 births
2022 deaths
Cricketers from Neath
Footballers who switched code
Glamorgan cricketers
Leeds Rhinos players
Maesteg RFC players
Rugby league players from Neath
Rugby union fly-halves
Rugby union players from Neath
Wales international rugby union players
Welsh cricketers
Welsh rugby league players
Welsh rugby union players
Rugby league wingers
Rugby league centres